Anchor Bay (formerly Anchor Bay Settlement) is a census-designated place in Mendocino County, California. The population was 473 at the 2020 census.

Geography

Climate

The climate of Anchor Bay is Mediterranean, characterized by warm, dry summers, at times exceeding , and mild, rainy winters, with lows at night falling below freezing at times.

Demographics

At the 2010 census, Anchor Bay had a population of 340. The racial makeup of Anchor Bay was 301 (88.5%) White, 2 (0.6%) African American, 5 (1.5%) Native American, 2 (0.6%) Asian, 1 (0.3%) Pacific Islander, 12 (3.5%) from other races, and 17 (5.0%) from two or more races. Hispanic or Latino of any race were 29 people (8.5%).

The whole population lived in households; no one lived in non-institutionalized group quarters and no one was institutionalized.

There were 174 households, of which 25 (14.4%) had children under the age of 18 living in them, 85 (48.9%) were opposite-sex married couples living together, 11 (6.3%) had a female householder with no husband present, 6 (3.4%) had a male householder with no wife present.  There were 9 (5.2%) unmarried opposite-sex partnerships, and 12 (6.9%) same-sex married couples or partnerships. 53 households (30.5%) were one person and 26 (14.9%) had someone living alone who was 65 or older. The average household size was 1.95.  There were 102 families (58.6% of households); the average family size was 2.37.

The age distribution was 39 people (11.5%) under the age of 18, 8 people (2.4%) aged 18 to 24, 47 people (13.8%) aged 25 to 44, 161 people (47.4%) aged 45 to 64, and 85 people (25.0%) who were 65 or older.  The median age was 57.3 years. For every 100 females, there were 96.5 males.  For every 100 females age 18 and over, there were 96.7 males.

There were 327 housing units at an average density of 93.1 per square mile; of the occupied units, 128 (73.6%) were owner-occupied and 46 (26.4%) were rented. The homeowner vacancy rate was 3.6%; the rental vacancy rate was 2.1%.  255 people (75.0% of the population) lived in owner-occupied housing units and 85 people (25.0%) lived in rental housing units.

Politics

Personalities

References

Census-designated places in Mendocino County, California
Census-designated places in California